Goran Gjorgonoski (born 8 June 1979) is a former Macedonian handball player who played for RK Metalurg. From 2011 to 2015, he was a marketing director in RK Metalurg. He since has worked with Kiril Lazarov handball camp and school and is involved in Handball club Golden Art KL7.

References 
 http://www.eurohandball.com/ech/20/men/2010/player/514827/GoranGjorgonoski
 http://www.eurohandball.com/ec/cwc/men/2009-10/player/514827/GoranGjorgonoski
 http://www.balkan-handball.com/balkan/goran-gjorgonoski-napustio-metalurg-posle-13-godina/
 http://www.ehfcl.com/men/2008-09/player/514827/Goran+Gjorgonoski

1979 births
Living people
Macedonian male handball players